The Kogan Creek Power Station is a 750 megawatt coal fired power station owned by CS Energy on the Darling Downs in Queensland. The $1.2 billion plant is situated at Brigalow, in the Surat Basin between Dalby and Chinchilla.

The power station uses supercritical steam technology, which produces lower greenhouse gases emissions per energy unit delivered, and air-cooled surface condensers, which reduces water consumption. The plant consumes 90% less water when compared to conventional power stations through the use of dry cooling technology. The plant runs at 40 per cent efficiency, and requires 42 per cent less fuel input than conventional power stations.

Background
Kogan Creek consists of only one boiler-turbine-generator unit. At 750 MW, it is the largest single unit in Australia. Construction by a consortium led by Siemens commenced in 2004 and was completed in 2007.  It was opened by the Queensland Premier Anna Bligh and Minister for Mines and Energy Geoff Wilson on 27 November 2007.

The fuel source is the Kogan Creek coal deposit, which is also owned by CS Energy and will provide 2.8 million tonnes of black coal annually. The coal is delivered to the power station via a 4 km long conveyor belt.  The coal mine is operated by Golding Contractors, who has a contract to run the mine until 2018.

The plant's 40% efficiency is reached raising the steam pressure to 250 bar at 560 °C.

Carbon Monitoring for Action estimates this power station emits 4.33 million tonnes of greenhouse gases each year as a result of burning coal. The Australian Government has announced the introduction of a Carbon Pollution Reduction Scheme commencing in 2010 which is expected to impact on emissions from power stations. The National Pollutant Inventory provides details of other pollutant emissions, but, as at 23 November 2008, not CO2.

A , 275kV transmission line connects the power station to the National Electricity Market, providing power to Queensland and New South Wales.

Kogan Creek Solar Boost
In April 2011, the Kogan Creek Solar Boost project was officially launched. Funding for the project includes a $70 million commitment from CS Energy and a commitment of more than $34 million from the Australian Government, of which CS spent $50 million and ARENA spent $6.4 million. The project was to be constructed by Areva using superheated solar steam technology. Kogan Creek Solar Boost was to be the largest integration of solar technology with a coal-fired power station in the world. Construction started in 2011 and was originally scheduled for completion by 2013. Difficulties with the project and commercial issues delayed the project.

It was stated that the project, involving the installation of a CLFR solar thermal system, was capable of generating 44 MW electrical at peak solar conditions. But additional sources state that the 44 MW capacity was not additional to the full 744 MW net capacity of Kogan Creek, rather was an estimated contribution towards the total generation. Instead, steam from the solar field was to be first further heated and then used to power the intermediate pressure turbine, thereby displacing coal.  The project was expected to reduce carbon emissions by about 35,000 tonnes per year, which is 0.8% of emissions, at a cost of only A$3 per tonne of carbon for the first year's emissions alone.

On 18 March 2016, CS Energy announced that the Solar Boost demonstration project would not be completed, blaming "technical and contractual problems". By 2017, the equipment was being dismantled. CS Energy recorded a $70 million impairment in its 2016 accounts because of the project.

CS Energy explained in a report to ARENA why the project was cancelled. Kogan Creek being AREVA Solar's first commercial project, compounded by the supply chain inexperience, resulted in delays and rework. Works where suspended when an alternative local supplier had to be selected. The technology design was new and not completely optimised, causing more site labour. AREVA Solar treated the economiser boiler tubes with a "Solonyx" internally developed coating. But most of the economiser boiler tubes rusted both before and after installation. AREVA Solar stopped production of that coating after that. Culminating that, in August 2014, AREVA announced its solar business exit.

Per CS Energy, the project (having no thermal conservation/storage capacity) had problems with "rapidly moving clouds". Site Manager Ian Canham noted he had observed multiple problems with Areva Solar communication and planning. Also, workers brought in from the US lacked safety training and safety gear. On the supply side, after sitting in 2011 floodwaters at the Port of Brisbane during a dispute between Areva and shipping company DHL, 80 per cent of pipes for the project were damaged by rust. Other steel ordered for the project was completely unusable and had to be scrapped. Some necessary parts became unavailable when a Newcastle supplier went out of business.

See also

Coal mining in Australia
Energy policy of Australia
List of active power stations in Queensland
Solar power in Australia
List of largest power stations in the world

References

External links
 Kogan Solar Boost Project
 Kogan Creek Solar Boost
 'Fast-moving clouds': How CS Energy's Kogan Creek Solar Boost project failed
 New generation brings major change

Coal-fired power stations in Queensland
Darling Downs
Power stations in Queensland
2007 establishments in Australia
Energy infrastructure completed in 2007